Treasure of Monte Cristo is a 1949 American film noir crime film directed by William Berke and starring Glenn Langan, Adele Jergens and Steve Brodie.

Plot
A descendant of Edmond Dantès finds himself framed for a crime he did not commit.

Cast
 Glenn Langan as Edmund Dantes
 Adele Jergens as Jean Turner
 Steve Brodie as Earl Jackson
 Robert Jordan as Tony Torecelli
 Michael Whalen as Lt. Michael Perry
 George Davis as District Attorney
 Margia Dean as Nurse
 Sid Melton as Tyson (as Sidney Melton)
 Brian O'Hara as Jailer
 Robert Boon as Boatswain
 Jeritza Novak as Miss Jean Turner
 Jimmy O'Neil as Pawnbroker
 Curtis Jarett as Deputy Sheriff
 Charles Regan as Bailey (as Charles Reagan)
 Larry Barton as Hotel Clerk
 Charles Schaeffer as Robert (as Rube Schaeffer)
 Don Junior as Bellboy

Production
The film was entirely shot in location in San Francisco.

References

External links

1949 films
American crime films
1940s English-language films
Films directed by William A. Berke
Films scored by Albert Glasser
1940s crime films
Lippert Pictures films
American black-and-white films
Films with screenplays by Aubrey Wisberg
Films shot in San Francisco
Films based on The Count of Monte Cristo
1940s American films